A Gundi is a small, stocky rodent found in Africa.

Gundi may also refer to:
Common gundi, North African gundi
Gundi, Bihar, Indian village
Gundi Busch (1935–2014), German figure skater
Gundi Ellert (born in 1951), German television actress
Gundi, nickname of German musician Gerhard Gundermann

See also
Gundy (disambiguation)
Gund (disambiguation)
Grundy (disambiguation)